Zygmunt Paweł Maszczyk (born 3 May 1945, in Siemianowice Śląskie) is a retired Polish football player.

He played mostly for Ruch Chorzów.

He played for the Poland national team (36 matches/0 goals) and was a participant at the 1974 FIFA World Cup, where Poland won the bronze medal, at the 1972 Summer Olympics, where Poland won the gold medal and at the 1976 Summer Olympics, where Poland won the silver medal.

Details
Early in his career (1955–1962), Maszczyk played in local club in Siemianowice Śląskie. He moved to the well-renowned Ruch Chorzów in 1963 and played for Ruch till 1976 in 310 matches. He was instrumental in Ruch becoming three time national champion (1968, 1974, 1975) and winning the Polish Cup (1974).

During his career, Maszczyk was perhaps the most popular player of Ruch. He was well regarded for his flawless technique, exceptional work ethic, tirelessness, and quietness and aversion to media.

As an example of his style, Maszczyk was acclaimed as obviously moving the most in the field of all the players of the Poland national team that won the medal in the 1974 World Cup.

Fans called him "Zyga" (a Silesian diminutive for Zygmunt).

Later, Maszczyk moved to Germany, where he left the sports career. By 1981, he lived and work in Lüdenscheid.

References

  Polish Olympic Committee entry
  Ruch Chorzów profile

1945 births
Living people
Polish footballers
Polish expatriate footballers
Poland international footballers
Ruch Chorzów players
Valenciennes FC players
Ligue 1 players
Expatriate footballers in France
Polish expatriate sportspeople in France
1974 FIFA World Cup players
Footballers at the 1972 Summer Olympics
Footballers at the 1976 Summer Olympics
Olympic footballers of Poland
Olympic gold medalists for Poland
Olympic silver medalists for Poland
People from Siemianowice Śląskie
Ekstraklasa players
Olympic medalists in football
Sportspeople from Silesian Voivodeship
Medalists at the 1976 Summer Olympics
Medalists at the 1972 Summer Olympics
Association football midfielders